The Land Before Time (2007–2008) is an American animated television series, based on The Land Before Time film series created by Judy Freudberg and Tony Geiss. It was developed for television by Ford Riley for Cartoon Network and was produced by Universal Animation Studios and Amblin Entertainment (Amblin Entertainment produced the first film with Sullivan Bluth Studios), and animated by Toon City in the Philippines. It premiered on YTV in Canada for a test on January 5, 2007 and premiered on Cartoon Network in the United States on March 5, 2007.

It was made as traditionally animated with CGI backgrounds, which the past sequels from The Land Before Time X: The Great Longneck Migration onwards have used, with occasional cel-shaded computer animated characters in wide shots. The main antagonists in the series are Red Claw, an evil villainous Tyrannosaurus, and Screech and Thud, two henchmen Deinonychus. The TV series takes place after the events of The Land Before Time XIII: The Wisdom of Friends, due to Chomper and Ruby being absent in that film.

Voice cast

Main 
 Cody Arens as Littlefoot (Anthony Skillman performs Littlefoot's singing voice)
 Anndi McAfee as Cera
 Aria Curzon as Ducky
 Jeff Bennett as Petrie
 Rob Paulsen as Spike, Thud
 Max Burkholder as Chomper
 Meghan Strange as Ruby
 Pete Sepenuk as Red Claw, Screech

Recurring 
 Kenneth Mars as Grandpa Longneck
 Miriam Flynn as Grandma Longneck
 John Ingle as Daddy Topps
 Tress MacNeille as Petrie's Mother/Ducky and Spike's Mother
 Dorian Harewood as Mr. Thicknose
 Jessica Gee as Tria
 Meghan Strange as Tricia
 Susanne Blakeslee as Additional Voices

Guest appearances 
 Anndi McAfee as Lydia/Corythosaurus/additional voices 
 Aria Curzon as Ceratogaulus Girl/additional voices 
 Jeff Bennett as Brontosaurus #2/Ruby's siblings/Skip/Mutt/Doc/Kosh (The Amazing Threehorn Girl)/Ceratogaulus Elder/additional voices 
 Rob Paulsen as Ruby's father/Brontosaurus #1/Hidden Runner/Mo/Milo/Stegosaurus/Guido/Lambeosaurus/additional voices 
 Meghan Strange as Plower/Maiasaura/Iguanodon/Corythosaurus
 Pete Sepenuk as Kosh (The Star Day Celebration)/Saro/Allosaurus
 Nika Futterman as Ruby's Mother/Ali
 Elizabeth Daily as Rhett/Shorty
 Jessica Walter as Old One
 Cree Summer as Tippy
 Susan Krebs as Tippy's mother
 Cam Clarke as Bron
 Susan Blu as Dara
 Mikey Kelley as Hyp
 Scott Menville as Nod/Mother Deinonychus
 Kevin Michael Richardson as Scuttle
 Dorian Harewood as Great Hideous Beast
 Jess Harnell as Swooper
 Dee Bradley Baker as Baby Acrocanthosaurus (uncredited)/Sarcosuchus pack

Episodes

Season 1 (2007)

Season 2 (2008)

Broadcast 
The show premiered on Cartoon Network in the United States on March 5, 2007. It also aired on Boomerang in the United Kingdom on April 16, 2007. The show has never aired on either Cartoon Network in the United States or on YTV in Canada since March 2008. On January 14, 2017, the show began airing in reruns on Sprout. It aired on Spacetoon on January 1, 2011 after Spacetoon English closed and the Spacetoon Group was rebranded. It aired on TV Russia on May 2, 2009 after TV Russia Service Television (TV RSTV) closed. Reruns of the series began airing on Universal Kids upon the channel's launch on September 9, 2017.

Reception 
Michael D. Schaffer of the Philadelphia Inquirer said that the animation in the series, although below that of the original 1988 movie, was above-average for modern television. Although he praised the theme song, saying it had a "bouncy, almost calypso beat", he was less pleased with the songs "Adventuring" and "Talking Big". He finally described the series as "bland, inoffensive stuff", and appropriate viewing for very young audiences.

Merchandise 
Universal Studios Consumer Products Group and Playmates Toys announced a domestic licensing agreement, whereby Playmates served as the master toy license for the then-upcoming animated television series, The Land Before Time. The 22-minute animated series aired on Cartoon Network beginning spring 2007. The toy line launched in fall 2007 with the introduction of a full line of figures, vehicles, playsets and plush.

Home media 
Twenty-four episodes of the series were released on DVD by Universal Studios Home Entertainment between 2007–2008 in North America (region 1) and 2010 in Australia (region 4) in the form of six four-episode volumes. A six-disc box set was later released in the UK (region 2) in 2012 containing the 24 episodes from the previous volumes. Two episodes were not included in those releases: "The Hidden Canyon" and "The Big Longneck Test". Only "The Hidden Canyon" was later released as a special feature on the stand-alone DVD release of The Land Before Time XIII: The Wisdom of Friends. On June 7, 2022, a complete TV series DVD was released, not only marking the first time "The Big Longneck Test" has been released on home media but also the first time any episode has been released in widescreen format on a Region 1 DVD.

Music 
The songs are written by Michele Brourman (music) and Ford Riley (lyrics).

The theme song is performed by the South African choir Ladysmith Black Mambazo. The theme is written by Roc Gagliese, Steve D'Angelo, and Terry Tompkins of the eggplant. The music score is by Cory Lerios.

See also 
 Dink, the Little Dinosaur

References

External links 

 Official Land Before Time YouTube channel
 

2007 American television series debuts
2008 American television series endings
2000s American animated television series
The Land Before Time
Television series by Universal Animation Studios
YTV (Canadian TV channel) original programming
Animated television shows based on films
Animated television series about dinosaurs
English-language television shows
Television series by Amblin Entertainment
Television series by Universal Television
American children's animated adventure television series